Château de Châteauneuf was a castle in Châteauneuf-en-Thymerais, Eure-et-Loir, France. It was destroyed in the 16th century.

History 
The castle was slighted by King Henry I of England in 1169, following the destruction of Chennebrun, located on the left bank of the Avre, by the French in 1168. King Henry II of England, burned the castle and it was rebuilt in 1189 by Hughes III du Chatel, lord of Thymerais. King Louis VII of France visited the castle on the occasion of the inauguration of the fair of Saint-Jacques Boutaincourt.

See also 
List of châteaux in Eure-et-Loir

References
Dictionnaire topographique du département d'Eure-et-Loir. Société archéologique d'Eure-et-Loir. Imprimerie impériale, 1861.

Further reading
Power, Daniel. The Norman Frontier in the Twelfth and Early Thirteenth Centuries. Cambridge studies in medieval life and thought. Cambridge University Press, 2004. 

Châteaux in Eure-et-Loir